Cryptophyton is a genus of corals belonging to the family Clavulariidae.

The species of this genus are found in Northern America.

Species:

Cryptophyton goddardi 
Cryptophyton jedsmithi

References

Octocorallia genera
Clavulariidae